Henry Godfrey may refer to:

 Henry Godfrey (academic) (1781–1832), English clergyman and academic, President of Queens' College, Cambridge
 Henry Godfrey (pioneer) (1824–1882), pioneer and settler of Victoria, Australia
 Henry Ronald Godfrey (1887–1968), English motor car design engineer